The 40th New York Infantry Regiment, also known as the "Mozart Regiment" or the "Constitution Guard", was an infantry regiment that served in the Union Army during the American Civil War.

The 40th New York also had the 2nd highest numbers of casualties of any New York Regiment, behind the famous 69th New York Infantry of the Irish Brigade.

Service

The 40th New York was mustered at Yonkers, New York, on June 27, 1861, sponsored by the Union Defense Committee of New York City by special authority from the War Department. Originally, the regiment was to be raised as the United States Constitution Guard by Colonel John S. Cocks of the 2nd New York but organization was not completed.  With additional sponsorship by the Mozart Hall Committee it adopted the name Mozart regiment. Despite being a New York Regiment, only the original Constitution Guard were New Yorkers.  The regiment was completed by taking four companies from Massachusetts and two from Pennsylvania.  On September 6, 1862, the regiment absorbed the enlisted men of the 87th New York Volunteer Infantry Regiment.  On May 30, 1863, it absorbed the three-year enlistees of the 37th New York, 38th New York, 55th New York, and 101st New York.  On August 3, 1864, the regiment absorbed the 74th New York.

Two men of the 40th New York earned the Medal of Honor during the Civil War. Sergeant Robert Boody of Company B was awarded the medal for carrying wounded comrades from the field at the Battles of Williamsburg and Chancellorsville, and Private Henry Klein of Company E earned it for capturing a Confederate flag at the Battle of Sayler's Creek.

The regiment mustered out on June 27, 1865, after participating in the Grand Review of the Armies.

Fair Oaks 

At the Battle of Fair Oaks (Seven Pines) the 40th New York gained considerable recognition for its action on June 1. The regiment's commander, Colonel Edward J. Riley, was kicked in the head and thrown by his horse prior to the battle, removing him from the front. Lt. Col. Thomas W. Egan led the regiment into battle on May 31, and on June 1 ordered a bayonet charge into the 5th and 8th Alabama regiments. The Mozart Regiment suffered 96 casualties, including every member of the color guard killed or wounded. Following the death of Color Sergeant Joseph Conroy, Color Corporal Robert Grieves, himself severely wounded, planted the flag far out in front of the regiment, before being ordered by Egan to withdraw.

Gettysburg, Second Day 

The 40th New York played a critical role in the defense of the Federal left flank during the second day at Gettysburg, delaying the approach of Law's Division to Little Round Top. Below Devil's Den, the men of the 40th New York were called upon to delay at all costs elements of Benning's Georgia brigade and Law's Alabama brigade, as Confederates began forcing back Hobart Ward's 2nd Brigade of the Third Corps. The 40th New York charged seven times down the course of Plum Run, into the boulders of Devil's Den and the Slaughter Pen.

Spotsylvania

Total strength and casualties
The regiment suffered 10 officers and 228 enlisted men who were killed in action or mortally wounded and 2 officers and 170 enlisted men who died of disease, for a total of 410 fatalities.

Commanders
Colonel Edward J. Riley
Colonel Madison M. Cannon

See also
List of New York Civil War regiments

Notes

References
The Civil War Archive

External links

New York State Military Museum and Veterans Research Center - Civil War - 40th Infantry Regiment History, photographs, table of battles and casualties, and historical sketch for the 40th New York Infantry Regiment.
 

Infantry 040
1861 establishments in New York (state)
Military units and formations established in 1861
Military units and formations disestablished in 1865